The 1998 Omloop Het Volk was the 52nd edition of the Omloop Het Volk cycle race and was held on 28 February 1998. The race started in Ghent and finished in Lokeren. The race was won by Peter Van Petegem.

General classification

References

1998
Omloop Het Nieuwsblad
Omloop Het Nieuwsblad
February 1998 sports events in Europe